Leda and the Swan is a c.1515 painting by Cesare da Sesto, a painter in the circle of Leonardo da Vinci. It is now in Wilton House near Salisbury, UK. With other versions now at the Galleria Borghese (probably also by Cesare) and Uffizi, it is thought to be one of three of the closest copies after Leonardo's own lost work on the subject.

References

1515 paintings
Paintings of children
Paintings in South West England
Wilton House